San San Maw is a footballer from Burma who currently plays as a defender.

International goals

External links 
 

Living people
Burmese women's footballers
Myanmar women's international footballers
Women's association football defenders
Burmese women's futsal players
Southeast Asian Games bronze medalists for Myanmar
Southeast Asian Games medalists in futsal
Competitors at the 2011 Southeast Asian Games
Competitors at the 2017 Southeast Asian Games
1980 births